PNET may refer to:

Peaceful Nuclear Explosions Treaty
Primitive neuroectodermal tumor
Pancreatic neuroendocrine tumor